Calcott is a hamlet in Sturry parish, in the Canterbury District of the English county of Kent.

References

Hamlets in Kent
City of Canterbury